Krakus Mound, also called the Krak Mound, is a tumulus located in the Podgórze district of Kraków, Poland; thought to be the resting place of Kraków's mythical founder, the legendary King Krakus. Together with nearby Wanda Mound, it is one of Kraków's two prehistoric mounds as well as the oldest man-made structure in Kraków. Nearby are also two other non-prehistoric, man-made mounds, Kościuszko Mound, constructed in 1823, and Piłsudski's Mound, completed in 1937. These four make up Kraków's four memorial mounds.

History 
The age and the original purpose of the mound remain a mystery, although religious and memorial purposes have been ascribed to the mounds. Excavations conducted in mid-1930s revealed that the mound consists of a solid wooden core covered with soil and turf. Some artifacts dating from between the 8th and 10th centuries were found inside, but no human remains or bones were discovered. According to another hypothesis the mound is of Celtic origin and dates from the 2nd-1st century BCE. Mythical origins are also connected to the mound. Krakus is said to have been constructed to honour the death of King Krakus when mourning townspeople filled their sleeves with sand and dirt and brought it to the site of the Krakus Mound to create a mountain that would rule over the rest of the landscape, as King Krakus had. Originally, four smaller mounds ringed the Krakus Mound, but they were demolished in the 19th century to create Kraków's city wall.

Similar to other ancient structures, such as Stonehenge, the Krakus Mound may have been constructed with astronomy in mind. If one stands on the Krakus Mound and looks towards Wanda Mound at sunrise on the morning of Beltane, the second-largest Celtic feast day, one will see the sun rise directly over Wanda Mound.

Until the mid-1830s, a folk festival was held annually on the first Tuesday after Easter on the slopes of the Krakus Mound. It's been revived in the 2000s and is being held annually again.

See also 
 Wanda Mound, legendary grave of Krakus' daughter
 Kościuszko Mound, in Kraków
 Piłsudski Mound, in Kraków

References 

Monuments and memorials in Kraków
Landmarks in Poland
Tumuli